14,000 Things to Be Happy About is a book by Barbara Ann Kipfer. Illustrated by Pierre Le-Tan. It was published in 1990 by Workman Publishing. The book is a list of about 14,000 random and sometimes abstract items, apparently compiled by the author over the course of 20 years. More than one million copies have been sold. It was ranked 11th on the 1990 paperback bestseller list. The 25th anniversary edition was published in 2014.

References

Self-help books
1990 non-fiction books
Books by Barbara Ann Kipfer
Workman Publishing Company books